Charles James Raff (9 October 1878 – 4 August 1948) was an Australian rules footballer who played with St Kilda and Carlton in the Victorian Football League (VFL).

Family
The son of James Raff (1839-98), and Ellen Jane Raff (1848-1915), née Powell, Charles James Raff was born in Carlton, Victoria on 9 October 1878.

He married Lillian Crossan in 1910. They had one child, Norman Charles Raff (1918-)

Football

St Kilda (VFL)
He played 5 games for St Kilda in 1899.

Carlton (VFL)
He played 3 games for Carlton in 1901. He was cleared from Carlton to Carlton Juniors in June 1901.

Preston (VFA)
He played four games for Preston in 1903.

Death
He died at his home in Coburg, Victoria on 4 August 1948.

Notes

References
 Holmesby, Russell & Main, Jim (2009). The Encyclopedia of AFL Footballers: every AFL/VFL player since 1897 (8th ed.). Melbourne, Victoria: Bas Publishing. .

External links 
 
 Charles Raff's profile at Blueseum
 
 Charles "Bunny" Raff's profile at The VFA Project.

1878 births
1948 deaths
Australian rules footballers from Melbourne
St Kilda Football Club players
Carlton Football Club players
People from Carlton, Victoria